Big Notebook for Easy Piano is the debut album by the Murfreesboro, Tennessee, band Fluid Ounces. It was recorded in Memphis, Tennessee, with producer Ross Rice.

Critical reception
Nashville Scene called the album "one of the year’s brightest pop records—an explosion of striking hooks and barbed wordplay, set off by a bouncy piano-based sound that veers from vaudeville to lush balladry."

Track listing
 "Shamrock" – 3:28
 "Tricky Fingers" – 3:34
 "Birdbrained" – 3:49
 "Liquorish Vampires" – 3:41
 "Daddy Scruff" – 5:42
 "Record Stack" – 3:32
 "Role Call" – 4:03
 "Spill Your Brains" – 3:10
 "Milk Moustache" – 3:27
 "Kept Alive by Science" – 4:10
 "Big Empty" – 4:52
 "Poor Man" – 3:30
  "Killjoy" – 5:03 (hidden track)

Credits
Seth Timbs (piano/guitar/vocals/songwriter)
Brian Rogers (guitar, vocals)
Ben Morton (bass)
Sam Baker (drums)
Richard Dortch (mixing, mastering)
Kathy Morgan (Photography)
Brian Bottcher (Artwork)

References

Fluid Ounces albums
1997 albums